Amboy is an unincorporated community in Webster County, Nebraska, United States.

History
Amboy was founded circa 1876. A post office was established at Amboy in 1879, and remained in operation until it was discontinued in 1890. The Amboy station was at the junction of two railroads.

References

Unincorporated communities in Webster County, Nebraska
Unincorporated communities in Nebraska